In differential geometry, the first fundamental form is the inner product on the tangent space of a surface in three-dimensional Euclidean space which is induced canonically from the dot product of .  It permits the calculation of curvature and metric properties of a surface such as length and area in a manner consistent with the ambient space.  The first fundamental form is denoted by the Roman numeral ,

Definition 

Let  be a parametric surface.  Then the inner product of two tangent vectors is

The first fundamental form may be represented as a symmetric matrix.

Further notation
When the first fundamental form is written with only one argument, it denotes the inner product of that vector with itself.

The first fundamental form is often written in the modern notation of the metric tensor.  The coefficients may then be written as : 

The components of this tensor are calculated as the scalar product of tangent vectors  and :

See example below.

Calculating lengths and areas

The first fundamental form completely describes the metric properties of a surface.  Thus, it enables one to calculate the lengths of curves on the surface and the areas of regions on the surface.  The line element  may be expressed in terms of the coefficients of the first fundamental form as
 

The classical area element given by  can be expressed in terms of the first fundamental form with the assistance of Lagrange's identity,

Example: curve on a sphere
A spherical curve on the unit sphere in  may be parametrized as

The coefficients of the first fundamental form may be found by taking the dot product of the partial derivatives.

so:

Length of a curve on the sphere

The equator of the unit sphere is a parametrized curve given by

with  ranging from 0 to 2.  The line element may be used to calculate the length of this curve.

Area of a region on the sphere

The area element may be used to calculate the area of the unit sphere.

Gaussian curvature

The Gaussian curvature of a surface is given by 

Theorema egregium of Gauss states that the Gaussian curvature of a surface can be expressed solely in terms of the first fundamental form and its derivatives, so that  is in fact an intrinsic invariant of the surface. An explicit expression for the Gaussian curvature in terms of the first fundamental form is provided by the Brioschi formula.

See also
Metric tensor
Second fundamental form
Third fundamental form
Tautological one-form

External links
First Fundamental Form — from Wolfram MathWorld

Differential geometry of surfaces
Differential geometry
Surfaces